Romain Duguet (born 7 October 1980) is a Swiss Olympic show jumping rider. He competed at the 2016 Summer Olympics in Rio de Janeiro, Brazil, where he finished 6th in the team and 32nd in the individual competition.

Duguet competed at the 2015 European Championships where he won a team bronze and placed 11th individually. He also participated at two editions of the Show Jumping World Cup finals (in 2016 and 2017), with his biggest success coming in 2017 when he finished in the runner-up position behind McLain Ward.

References

1980 births
Living people
Sportspeople from Reims
Swiss show jumping riders
Swiss male equestrians
Olympic equestrians of Switzerland
Equestrians at the 2016 Summer Olympics
Place of birth missing (living people)
21st-century Swiss people